Ahaziah ("held by Yah(-weh)"; Douay–Rheims: Ochozias) was the name of two kings mentioned in the Hebrew Bible:

Ahaziah of Israel
Ahaziah of Judah